The Schiller Prize was a Swiss literary award which was established in 1905 to promote Swiss literature and was awarded until 2012 when it was replaced as a national literary award by the Swiss Literature Awards.

The prize was awarded by the Schiller Foundation which awarded prizes each year to literary works by Swiss authors. The prize was in the amount of 10,000 francs. The Grand Prix Schiller of 30,000 francs was awarded less frequently. The Prix Schiller Découverte of 5,000 francs was awarded to new Swiss authors.

The Schiller Foundation continues to award the Prix Terra Nova to Swiss authors and translators.

Grand Prix winners 

 1920 – Carl Spitteler (1845–1924)
 1922 – Jakob Bosshart (1862–1924)
 1923 – Philippe Godet (1850–1922)
 1928 – Francesco Chiesa (1871–1973)
 1930 – Jakob Schaffner (1875–1944)
 1936 – Charles Ferdinand Ramuz (1878–1947)
 1938 - Vinicio Salati (1908-1994)
 1943 – Peider Lansel (1863–1943)
 1948 – Meinrad Inglin (1893–1971)
 1955 – Gonzague de Reynold (1880–1970)
 1960 – Friedrich Dürrenmatt (1921–1990)
 1973 – Max Frisch (1911–1991)
 1982 – Denis de Rougemont (1906–1985)
 1988 – Giorgio Orelli (1921–2013)
 1992 – Hugo Loetscher (1929–2009)
 1997 – Maurice Chappaz (1916–2009)
 2000 – Grytzko Mascioni (1936–2003)
 2005 – Erika Burkart (1922–2010)
 2010 – Philippe Jaccottet (1925)
 2012 – Giovanni Orelli (1928–2016) and Peter Bichsel (1935)

Schiller Prize winners 

 1938 Maurice Zermatten
 1938  Charles-François Landry, Contribution.
 1939 Charles-François Landry for Diégo, Ed. Guilde du Livre, 1939
 1942 Pericle Patocchi and Alice Rivaz 
 1943 Jean-Georges Lossier for Haute Cité, Ed. Kundig, 1943
 1944 Charles-François Landry, Prix d'honneur.
 1949 Charles-François Landry for Les Grelots de la mule, Ed. Eynard 1948 and Domitienne, Ed. Eynard, 1949.
 1950 Georges Méautis
 1951 Maria Lauber
 1956 Maurice Zermatten
 1957 Charles-François Landry for his literary work.
 1960 Léon Savary, for all of his work.
 1961 Jean Starobinski, Jean-Pierre Monnier
 1963 Jacques Chessex
 1964 Pierrette Micheloud for Valais de cœur, Ed. Monographic, 1964
 1967 Jean Pache for Analogies, Ed. de la Baconnière, Neuchâtel, 1966
 1969 Alexandre Voisard
 1971 Georges Haldas
 1974 S. Corinna Bille
 1975 Anna Felder for La disdetta
 1976 Jean-Claude Fontanet for L'Effritement
 1977 Georges Haldas, Monique Laederach for J'habiterai mon nom 
 1978 Mireille Kuttel for La Malvivante Ed. L'âge d'homme
 1978 Jean Pache for Le Corps morcelé, L'Age d'Homme, Lausanne, 1977
 1979 Anne Cuneo for all of her work
 1980 Pierrette Micheloud for Douce-amer, Ed. de la Baconnière, 1979, Jean-Pierre Monnier
 1981 Marie-José Piguet for Jean Fantoche, portrait bouffon d'une auguste famille
 1982 Anna Felder for Nozze alte
 1983 Nicolas Bouvier for Le poisson-scorpion, Paris, Gallimard, 1982, Monique Laederach for La femme séparée 
 1984 Catherine Safonoff Au nord du Capitaine
 1985 Hugo Loetscher
 1987 Peter Bichsel, Laurence Verrey
 1988 Amélie Plume for all of her work.
 1989 Franz Böni
 1992 Gisèle Ansorge for Les Tourterelles du Caire, Ed. Bernard Campiche, 1991
 1995 Jean-Bernard Vuillème for Lucie and all of his work
 1996 Yvette Z'Graggen for all of her work.
 1998 Jean-Luc Benoziglio for Le feu au lac
 1999 François Debluë for Figures de la patience, Moudon, Éditions Empreintes, 1998
 2000 Fabio Pusterla for Pietra sangue, Milan, Marcos y Marcos, 1999. Monique Laederach for all of her work 
 2001 Jean-François Duval for Boston Blues, Paris, Phébus, 2000.
 2002 Noëlle Revaz for Rapport aux bêtes,Paris, Gallimard, 2002.
 2003 Benoît Damon for "le Passage du sableur", paris, L'Arpenteur, 2000.
 2004 François Debluë for all of his work.
 2005 Ágota Kristóf for all of her work.
 2006 Jacques Probst for Huit monologues, Orbe, Bernard Campiche Éditeur, 2005.
 2007 José-Flore Tappy for Hangars, Moudon, Éditions Empreintes, 2006
 2008 Jean-François Haas for Dans la gueule de la baleine guerre, Éditions Seuil, 2007
 2009 Pascale Kramer for L'implacable brutalité du réveil, Éditions Mercure de France, 2009
 2011 Thomas Sandoz for Même en terre, Éditions d'autre part, 2010 / Grasset, 2012
 2012 Nicolas Verdan for Le patient du docteur Hirschfeld, Éditions Bernard Campiche, 2011

Découverte prize winners 
 2006 Catherine Lovey for L’homme interdit 
 2009 Dominique de Rivaz for Douchinka
 2011 Douna Loup for L'embrasure, Paris, Mercure de France, 2010

References 

Swiss literary awards